Franklin Ruehl was an American actor, ufologist and cryptozoologist. He has appeared on such shows as Jimmy Kimmel Live!, The Roseanne Show and Tom Green Live among others. Ruehl's own show, Mysteries from Beyond the Other Dominion, started on a public-access television cable TV channel in the Los Angeles area in the late 1980s, and then became the first Sci Fi Channel  original series in 1992. In 2006, he hosted several new episodes of the show on TomGreen.com.

Ruehl was rejected on an America's Got Talent audition with an act that encompassed sticking straws into a potato. In 2010, he appeared on several episodes of 1000 Ways to Die, as an expert, portraying a cryptozoologist, a conspiracy expert and a deathologist/thanatologist. His show Professor Weird debuted at 9pm on August 18, 2012 on the Science Channel.

Ruehl has been a regular on "A Current Affair" (2005), "9 On The Town" (with a UFO segment), "Strange Universe," "Weird TV," and Ancient Aliens (on the History Channel).  He co-hosted a radio program on Blog Talk Radio, "Hypergalactic Enigmas." Ruehl has a series of videos entitled The Realm of Bizarre News, which can be viewed here.

He held a Ph.D. in theoretical nuclear physics from UCLA.

Ruehl died in November 2015, of natural causes.

References

External links
Small bio

American male film actors
University of California, Los Angeles alumni
2015 deaths
America's Got Talent contestants
Ufologists
UFO conspiracy theorists
American conspiracy theorists